Peninsula Center is an unincorporated community in the town of Baileys Harbor in Door County, Wisconsin, United States.

Aerial view

Notes

Unincorporated communities in Wisconsin
Unincorporated communities in Door County, Wisconsin